Centrosomal protein of 57 kDa is a protein that in humans is encoded by the CEP57 gene. It is also known as translokin.

Translokin binds basic fibroblast growth factor (FGF2; MIM 134920) and mediates its nuclear translocation and mitogenic activity (Bossard et al., 2003).[supplied by OMIM]

References

External links
 
 PDBe-KB provides an overview of all the structure information available in the PDB for Human Centrosomal protein of 57 kDa

Further reading

Centrosome